August Ludwig Freiherr von Senarclens-Grancy (19 August 17943 October 1871) was the firstborn son of three sons and four daughters of César Auguste, Baron von Senarclens de Grancy, (born in 1763) and his wife Élizabeth Claudine Marie-Rose de Loriol (born in 1773). He is reputed to have been the long-time lover of Wilhelmine of Baden, the Grand Duchess consort of Hesse, and the actual father by her of the Empress consort Maria Alexandrovna of Russia and Prince Alexander of Hesse, ancestors of modern royalty in Bulgaria, Germany, Romania, Serbia, Spain, Sweden, United Kingdom and Russia.

Life
He became the stable master of Louis II, Grand Duke of Hesse, a major general and a knight in the Order of Malta. It is also alleged that he was the biological father of four of the children of his employer's wife and, therefore, a likely ancestor of Felipe VI of Spain and Charles III of the United Kingdom . He may also be a direct-line ancestor of several royal pretenders: Alexander, Crown Prince of Yugoslavia, King Michael of Romania and Georg Friedrich, Prince of Prussia, heir to the throne of the German Empire which collapsed at the end of World War I.

Senarclens de Grancy died in Jugenheim on 3 October 1871.

Marriage and children

Allegedly with Wilhelmine of Baden 
Louis II, Grand Duke of Hesse, bought the Heiligenberg estate near Jugenheim in 1820, where he installed Senarclens-Grancy as his chamberlain later that year. Louis II's wife, the Grand Duchess Wilhelmine, began living at Heiligenberg during the summers, and wintered at other estates, rarely accompanying her husband from then on. The Grand Duchess gave birth to four more children between 1821 and 1824 after not bearing any children to Louis II for nine years. Senarclens-Grancy's paternity was strongly suspected, and was treated as an open secret by the Hessian court. Louis II did not deny paternity nor sought to disinherit the two children who lived to adulthood.

Grand Duchess Wilhelmine's children born after 1820 were:
 Princess Amalia Elisabeth Luise Karoline Friederike Wilhelmine (20 May 182127 May 1826).
 Stillborn daughter (7 June 1822).
 Prince Alexander Ludwig Georg Friedrich Emil (15 July 182315 December 1888), morganatically married to Countess Julie Hauke, she and their children being elevated to the title of Princes of Battenberg.
 Princess Maximiliane Wilhelmine Auguste Sophie Marie (8 August 18243 June 1880); the future Empress consort of Alexander II of Russia.

Marriage to Luise von Otting und Fünfstetten 
On 15 November 1836, Senarclens de Grancy married Luise Wilhelmine Camille von Otting und Fünfstetten (born von Schönfeld; 24 May 181018 May 1876), was a morganatic descendant of the Counts Palatine of Zweïbrucken and the Margraves of Baden-Durlach.
 Baroness Wilhelmine Marie (11 August 183722 November 1912), unmarried.
 Baron Ludwig (9 June 18392 February 1910), married Amalie Barbara Löw, sometimes written Loewe.
 Baroness Marie Wilhelmine (9 June 18405 July 1908), married Ludwig Heinrich Hesse, sometimes written Hess.
 Baron Heinrich Adolph Maximilian Ludwig (31 July 184517 January 1908), unmarried.
 Baron Albert Ludwig Friedrich (9 February 184720 January 1901), married Antoinette de Senarclens de Grancy, a cousin.
 Baroness Constance Marie Wilhelmine (11 September 18529 March 1933), married Karl von Oertzen.

Ancestry

Notes

References
 de Senarclens, Jean (2004) 800 ans d'histoire de la famille de Senarclens et de sa branche de Grancy, Genève : Slatkine, 
 Lambton, Antony (1989) The Mountbattens : the Battenburgs and young Mountbatten, London : Constable, 
 Shelton, Darren  (1998) "Royal Quarterings: The ahnenreihe of the grandchildren of the last Grand Duke of Hesse and by Rhine", European Royal History Journal, I (VI:August), p. 19-22

1794 births
1871 deaths
Swiss military personnel
19th-century Swiss military personnel